The Darbar-e-Sadria (Full Name: Khanqah e Naqshbandiyyah, Mujaddadiyyah, Sadria -Urdu/) is a khanqah at Haripur, KPK, Pakistan. Darbar-e-Sadria consists of the Sadria Mosque, Madrassah Rabbaniyyah, Guest house, Library and the Shrine of the Sadr ul Aaoliya (RTA). The Mosque, Madrassah, and Library, the foundation of the Sadria Mosque, Madrassah Rabbaniyyah, guesthouse, and the vast library was laid by the founder of the khanqah, Sadr ul Aaoliya Qazi Muhammad Sadruddin.

Islamic holy places
Mosques in Khyber Pakhtunkhwa
Haripur District